Area codes 214, 469, 972, and 945 are telephone area codes in the North American Numbering Plan (NANP) for Dallas, Texas and most of the eastern portion of the Dallas–Fort Worth metroplex. The area codes are assigned in an overlay plan to a single numbering plan area that was the core of one of the original area codes of 1947, area code 214.

History
The original configuration of 1947 of the North American Numbering Plan divided the state of Texas into four numbering plan areas (NPAs): 214, 512, 713, and 915. The northwestern part, stretching from the far west El Paso to the Texas Panhandle in the north and to Fort Worth in the east, was identified with area code 915, while area code 214 was assigned to the northeastern part of the state, roughly from a line just west of Dallas to Waco, to the borders of Arkansas and Louisiana.

In 1954, most of Tarrant County was combined with much of the eastern region of area code 915 to form area code 817.

Despite the growth of the Dallas metropolitan area in the second half of the 20th century, this configuration remained in place for thirty six years. In 1990, the entire eastern portion of the 214 area was split off with  area code 903.

The 1990 split was intended as a long-term solution, but within five years 214 was close to exhaustion due to the rapid growth of the Metroplex as well as the popularity of cell phones, fax machines and pagers. As a remedy, all of the old 214 territory outside Dallas and Dallas County was split off with area code 972 in 1995. Within only two years, however, both 214 and 972 were on the verge of exhaustion again. Area code 469 was introduced on July 1, 1999, in an overlay plan for most of the eastern portion of the Metroplex. At the same time, the 214/972 boundary was "erased," and 972 was converted into an additional overlay for the entire region. The result was three area codes overlaying the same area, with ten-digit dialing required for all calls.

Since 2000, 214 and 972 have served as overlays for portions of eastern Tarrant County (Arlington, Bedford, Euless, Grapevine, Southlake, and Colleyville) which are closer to Dallas.

While this had the effect of allocating over 23 million numbers to an area of just over nine million people, under 2018 projections, the Dallas area will need a fourth area code by mid-2021. Area code 945 was selected as the fourth area code in the Dallas overlay, after receiving approval from the Public Utility Commission of Texas. Central office code assignments for NPA 945 have been available since January 15, 2021, but can only be requested after all existing area codes are exhausted.

Service area
Counties served by these area codes are
 Collin, Dallas, Denton, Ellis, Johnson, Kaufman, Navarro, Rockwall and generally eastern parts of Tarrant.

Towns and cities served are:

 Addison
 Allen
 Anna
 Arlington
 Avalon
 Bardwell
 Bedford
 Blue Ridge
 Carrollton
 Cedar Hill
 Celina
 Cockrell Hill
 Colleyville
 Combine
 Copeville
 Coppell
 Crandall
 Dallas
 DeSoto
 Duncanville
 Elmo
 Ennis
 Euless
 Farmers Branch
 Farmersville
 Fate
 Ferris
 Flower Mound
 Forney
 Forreston
 Frisco
 Garland
 Glenn Heights
 Grand Prairie
 Grapevine
 Highland Park
 Highland Village
 Hurst
 Hutchins
 Irving
 Italy
 Josephine
 Kaufman
 Lancaster
 Lavon
 Lewisville
 Little Elm
 Lucas
 Maypearl
 McKinney
 Melissa
 Mesquite
 Midlothian
 Milford
 Murphy
 Nevada
 Oak Leaf
 Palmer
 Pecan Hill
 Plano
 Princeton
 Prosper
 Red Oak
 Rice
 Richardson
 Rockwall
 Rosser
 Rowlett
 Royse City
 Sachse
 Scurry
 Seagoville
 Sunnyvale
 Talty
 Terrell
 The Colony
 University Park
 Venus
 Waxahachie
 Westminster
 Weston
 Wilmer
 Wylie

In addition, Dallas–Fort Worth International Airport is served by area code 972.

See also
List of Texas area codes

References

External links

List of exchanges from AreaCodeDownload.com, 214 Area Code
List of exchanges from AreaCodeDownload.com, 469 Area Code
List of exchanges from AreaCodeDownload.com, 972 Area Code
 List of exchanges from AreaCodeDownload.com, 936 Area Code
 List of All cities of 214 Area Code

Dallas
214, 469, 945, and 972
214
Telecommunications-related introductions in 1947
Telecommunications-related introductions in 1996
Telecommunications-related introductions in 1999